Fifita is a Tongan given name and surname. Notable people with the name include:

Given name:
Fifita Moala (born 1980), Tongan rugby league footballer
Fifita Mounga (born 1973), Tongan rugby union footballer

Surname:
Andrew Fifita (born 1989), Australian rugby league footballer
Tonga Fifita (born 1959), Tongan professional wrestler
Alipate Fifita (born 1982), Tongan professional wrestler
Steve Fifita (born 1982), American football player
Pila Fifita (born 1975), Tongan rugby union footballer 
Talai Fifita (born 1962), Tongan rugby union footballer
John Fifita, Tongan rugby league footballer
Vaea Fifita, New Zealand rugby union footballer
Vunipola Fifita (born 1996), Australian rugby union footballer

Tongan-language surnames
Surnames of Tongan origin
Tongan given names